Hugo Matheusz. Steyn (1577 – 1632), was a Dutch Golden Age notary and member of the Haarlem schutterij.

Biography
He was born in Haarlem as the son of the mayor and church warden Mattheus Steyn and Dirkje van der Graft-Gael. He was the brother of the Spaarndam toll collector Tyman Matheusz. Steyn. Hugo became the city secretary and was a member of the Catholic St. James guild (St. Jacobsgilde) and married Cornelia van der Meyde in 1606. He became lieutenant of the St. George militia in Haarlem from 1612-1615 and was captain 1618-1621. He was portrayed by Frans Hals along with his son in The Banquet of the Officers of the St George Militia Company in 1616.

He died in Haarlem.

References

Hugo Matheusz. Steyn in De Haarlemse Schuttersstukken, by Jhr. Mr. C.C. van Valkenburg, pp. 67, Haerlem : jaarboek 1958, ISSN 0927-0728, on the website of the North Holland Archives

1577 births
1632 deaths
Frans Hals
People from Haarlem